Larisa Aleksandrovna Medvedeva (born 25 June 2001) is a Russian taekwondo practitioner. She won the silver medal in the women's 46 kg event at the 2021 European Taekwondo Championships held in Sofia, Bulgaria.

References

External links 
 

Living people
2001 births
Place of birth missing (living people)
Russian female taekwondo practitioners
European Taekwondo Championships medalists
21st-century Russian women